Testis expressed 55 (TEX55) is a human protein that is encoded by the C3orf30 gene located on the forward strand of human chromosome three, open reading frame 30 (3q13.32). TEX55 (accession number: NM_152539.3) is also known as Testis-specific conserved, cAMP-dependent type II PK anchoring protein (TSCPA), and uncharacterized protein C3orf30.

Gene 
The TEX55 gene is 13,893 bp and spans from base pair 119,146,151 to 119,160,042. This gene is flanked by immunoglobulin superfamily member 11 and Uroplakin1B.

Promoter 
The promoter region of TEX55 has multiple SRY box-6 and SOX/SRY-sex/testis determining and related HMG box transcription factor binding sites, as well as an X-linked zinc finger binding site. This indicates that the sex chromosomes may play a role in post-translational modification and expression.

Homology

Paralogs 
The TEX55 protein has no known human paralogs.

Orthologs 
TEX55 has orthologs in many mammals including, bats, dolphins, and even aardvarks. According to BLAST the TEX55 protein cannot be found outside of clade Mammalia. The most distant ortholog, found using BLAST, was in the aardvark, which is thought to have diverged an estimated 105 MYA. However, according to GeneCard, distant orthologs have also been found in chickens, lizards (Anolis carolinensis), and zebrafish.

mRNA 
The mRNA of TEX55 is 1800 base pairs long and has three exons. According to GeneCard, the TEX55 mRNA has 3 theoretical splice forms, but only the one containing all three exons have been studied and characterized. The 5’ UTR of the mRNA has an RFX1 binding site, which binds to a stem-loop structure just upstream of the start codon, used to activate transcription.

Protein 

The translated protein of the TEX 55 mRNA is 536 AA, a predicted molecular weight of 60 kD, had an isoelectric point of 5.51, and is highly conserved at the C-terminus. Tex55 has a slightly high amount of Glutamine and a slightly low amount of Leucine, which compared to the protein database swp23s.q. Multiple sequence alignment of TEX55 and 20 mammalian orthologs show that there are 28 residues, concentrated in the C-terminus, that are conserved between all proteins. The highly conserved residues are outlined in the conceptual translation and multiple sequence analysis. Through function-region analysis, researchers found that this protein may act as an anchoring protein of cAMP-dependent type-II PK, and might be an A-kinase anchoring proteins.

Post-Translational Modifications 
Analysis of the sumoylation sites indicate that Lys 14 has a high probability of being sumoylated. The TEX55 protein has a high number of potential phosphorylation/O-glycosylation sites.

Secondary Structure 
All secondary structure prediction analysis indicate that the C-terminus of Tex 55 has a high probability of being an alpha-helix, and indicate that there is little to no amount of beta-sheets. Secondary structure analysis tools predict that the majority of the Tex 55 protein is coiled domains, and alpha-helices.

Tertiary Structure 
Tertiary structures of TEX55 was generated using Phyre2. The C-terminus, which is highly conserved, was calculated to have a 30 residue alpha-helix that has relatively high confidence (82.3%). The highly conserved, high-confidence, alpha-helix is colored in red in the 3D structure image of TEX55 to the above. The overall tertiary structure of TEX55 is globular.

Motifs 
Tex55 has two motifs according to GeneCard: EF-Hand Calcium Binding Domain 10 and Uroplakin 1B, both of which are found in the middle of the protein. Uroplakin 1B is known to regulate cell development, activation, growth, and motility. This could indicate why abnormalities in TEX55 expression leads to sperm with altered morphology.

Protein Localization 
Analysis the cellular localization probability of Tex55 and its orthologs indicate that it is most likely located in the nucleus of the cell. Below is a list of orthologs and the probability of finding that protein in the specified cellular location.

Expression 
Expression of TEX55 mRNA can be found in most tissues in the human body, from the brain to the prostate. However, the protein produced by this mRNA has been shown to be produced mainly in the testis of mammals, according to NCBI. Analysis done by the Human Protein Atlas indicates that the TEX55 protein can be found not only in the testis, but also the bronchus, Fallopian tubes, and endometrium.

Clinical significance 
Being produced mainly in the testis of mammals, researchers believe that the protein product of TEX55 plays a role in spermatogenesis. It has been shown that individuals with Cryptorchidism and Sertoli-cell-only syndrome, which are both associated with sterility, do not produce this protein in their testis.  Microarray analysis of individuals with Teratozoospermia, a condition that is characterized by ~96% of sperm morphology being altered, indicates that TEX55 expression is reduced by ~20%. In clinical research, the TEX55 protein products have been detected in mice starting at 38 days old, then up regulated for at least 6 month.

References